Fabio Fabbi (18 July 1861, Bologna - 24 September 1946, Casalecchio di Reno) was an Italian Orientalist painter and illustrator.

Life and work
He studied painting and sculpture with Augusto Rivalta, at the Academy of Fine Arts, Florence, where he would become a Professor in 1893.

He exhibited at the "Società promotrice di belle arti " (Society for the Promotion of the Fine Arts) in Turin, and at the "Mostre di belle arti" in Milan. In 1892, he was named a Knight in the Order of the Crown of Italy.

In addition to his paintings, he illustrated the works of Virgil and Lodovico Ariosto, as well as Italian translations of works by Louisa May Alcott, Charles Dickens, Jules Verne and Edgar Rice Burroughs, among many others.

Selected paintings

Sources
 Ulrich Thieme, Felix Becker, Hans Vollmer: Allgemeines Lexikon der Bildenden Künstler von der Antike bis zur Gegenwart, Vol.11  E. A. Seemann, 1915 pgs.146-147 Online
 Caroline Juler, Les orientalistes de l'école italienne, ACR Edition, 1996 pgs.68-71  Online
 Angelo De Gubernatis, Dizionario degli artisti italiani viventi'', Le Monnier, pgs.189-190 Online

External links

 More works by Fabbi @ ArtNet

1861 births
1946 deaths
19th-century Italian painters
19th-century male artists
20th-century Italian painters
Artists from Bologna
Accademia di Belle Arti di Firenze alumni
Orientalist painters